Tom Stuart (25 October 1893 – 10 February 1957) was an English footballer who played as a left back for Bootle Albion and Tranmere Rovers. He made 205 appearances for Tranmere, scoring 13 goals.

References

Tranmere Rovers F.C. players
1893 births
1957 deaths
English footballers
Association football fullbacks
Footballers from Liverpool